Men in Black: The Series – Crashdown is a first-person shooter video game based on the animated television series, Men in Black: The Series. The game was developed by Runecraft and published by Infogrames for the PlayStation. And was released during November of 2001, and received mixed and average reviews.

Gameplay
The game's story revolves around extraterrestrial terrorists causing damages to New York City. The player chooses to play as either Agent J or Agent K, from the television series and film, who must stop the attempted alien invasion. The game is a first-person shooter consisting of 26 levels that are spread across various locations. Maps are provided to the player for each level. Agent Zed, the leader of the Men in Black organization, briefs the player in cutscenes that appear in between levels. Voice acting is done during cutscenes. And in each level, players must complete various goals to advance, which include solving many puzzles.

The player must defend against various alien enemies that are capable of walking, crawling, flying, and hanging from ceilings. If the player kills an innocent bystander, or fails an objective, the level ends and a player is required to start a level over again. The player begins the game with a pistol-like weapon. As the game progresses, the player upgrades to more powerful weapons, including the Noisy Cricket from the film. Rather than using ammunition clips, the player must reload weapons at charging stations that are scattered throughout each level and are disguised as objects such as payphones, automated teller machines, and vending machines.

Development and release
During May of 2001, Infogrames showed during the Electronic Entertainment Expo (E3) that it had obtained authorization to create a first-person shooter video game based on the animated television series, to be developed by Runecraft with a planned release for the PlayStation at the end of the year. And Men in Black – The Series: Crashdown was released in the United States on November 20th.

Reception

On Metacritic, the game has a score of 59/100, indicating "mixed or average reviews".

Computer and Video Games wrote that "for a bit of mindless mission-solving and alien-blasting this is worth a look," stating that, "Controls are easy, so getting stuck in isn't a problem. Good fun if a little lightweight for hardened blast freaks." Suzi Sez of GameZone considered the game and its graphics "slightly above average", but wrote, "The voice characterizations were fairly decent and the overall music was better than average." Sez stated, "I wasn't overly impressed with this particular game. It lacks pizzazz and punch and it plays more like a hack 'n slash type game".

Tina Bradley of Gamezilla praised the game's "amusing" cutscenes and its sound effects, and called it one of the few Men in Black video games to successfully capture "some of the quirky humor and neat gadgets from the movie." However, Bradley criticized the game for "stealing a lot of elements from the Alien movies/game, from the enemy designs to the radar detector." Bradley considered the gameplay exceptional but "not groundbreaking by any means". Bradley noted that the graphics were "decent, but not spectacular", stating that they "have a cartoony look to them that fits with the television series". Bradley concluded, "This game is not the best shooter out there, but it is solid. It makes good use of the MIB license, and fans of the movie and cartoon should enjoy this game if they like first-person shooters at all."

References

External links
 Men in Black – The Series: Crashdown at MobyGames

2001 video games
First-person shooters
PlayStation (console) games
PlayStation (console)-only games
Video games based on Men in Black
Infogrames games
Video games about extraterrestrial life
Video games developed in the United Kingdom
Video games set in New York City
Single-player video games